De Dion-Bouton was a French automobile manufacturer and railcar manufacturer operating from 1883 to 1953. The company was founded by the Marquis Jules-Albert de Dion, Georges Bouton, and Bouton's brother-in-law Charles Trépardoux.

Steam cars

The company was formed in 1883 after de Dion saw a toy locomotive in a store window in 1881 and asked the toymakers to build another. Engineers Bouton and Trépardoux had been eking out a living with scientific toys at a shop in the Passage de Léon, near "rue de la Chapelle" in Paris. Trépardoux had long dreamed of building a steam car, but neither could afford it.

De Dion, already inspired by steam (in the form of rail locomotives) and with ample money, agreed, and De Dion, Bouton et Trépardoux was formed in Paris in 1883. This became the De Dion-Bouton automobile company, the world's largest automobile manufacturer for a time, becoming well known for their quality, reliability, and durability.

Before 1883 was over, they had set up shop in larger premises in the Passage de Léon, Paris, tried and dropped steam engines for boats, and produced a steam car. With the boiler and engine mounted at the front, driving the front wheels by belts and steering with the rear, it burned to the ground on trials. They built a second, La Marquise, the next year, with a more conventional steering and rear-wheel drive, capable of seating four.

The Marquis de Dion entered one of these in an 1887 trial, "Europe's first motoring competition", the brainchild of one M. Fossier of cycling magazine Le Vélocipède. The vehicle survives, in road-worthy condition, and has been a regular entry in the London to Brighton Veteran Car Run.

Following this singular success, the company offered steam tricycles with boilers between the front wheels and two-cylinder engines. They were built in small numbers, evidently a favorite of young playboys. They were later joined by a larger tractor, able to pull trailers (sometimes called a "steam drag"). This larger vehicle introduced the so-called De Dion or "dead" axle; an axle beam carried the weight of the vehicle with the non weight-bearing driveshafts or drive chains articulated separately alongside it.

On 22 July 1894, during the Paris–Rouen race, it averaged  over the 126 km (78 mi) route, but was disqualified for needing both a driver and a stoker.

Two more cars were made in 1885 followed by a series of lightweight two-cylinder tricars, which from 1892 had Michelin pneumatic tyres. In 1893, steam tractors were introduced which were designed to tow horse-drawn carriages for passengers or freight (sometimes called "steam drags") and these used an innovative axle design which would become known as the De Dion tube, where the location and drive function of the axle are separated.

The company manufactured steam buses and trucks until 1904. Trépardoux, staunchly supporting steam, resigned in 1894 as the company turned to internal combustion vehicles. The steam car remained in production more or less unchanged for ten years more.

Internal combustion engines

Tricycles

By 1889, de Dion was becoming convinced the future lay in the internal combustion engine, and the company had built a ten-cylinder two-row rotary engine. After Trépardoux resigned in 1894, the company became De Dion, Bouton et Compagnie. For 1895, Bouton created a new  one-cylinder engine with trembler coil ignition. Proving troublesome at its designed speed of 900 rpm (throwing bearings and running rough), when Bouton increased the revs, the problems vanished. In trials, it achieved an unprecedented 3500 rpm, and was usually run at 2,000 rpm, a limit imposed by its atmospheric valves and surface carburettor. Inlet and exhaust valves were overhead, and a flywheel was fitted to each end of the crankshaft.

This engine was fitted behind the rear axle of a tricycle frame bought from Decauville, fitted with the new Michelin pneumatic tires. It showed superb performance, and went on the market in 1896 with the engine enlarged to 1¼ CV (horsepower) (932 W) , with 1¾ CV (1.3 kW) in 1897. By the time production of the petite voiture tricar stopped in 1901, it had 2¾ CV (2 kW), while racers had as much as 8 CV (6 kW).

In 1898, Louis Renault had a De Dion-Bouton modified with fixed drive shaft and ring and pinion gear, making "perhaps the first hot rod in history".

Four wheelers

The same year, the tricar was joined by a four-wheeler and in 1900 by a vis a vis voiturette, the Model D, with its 3¾ CV (2.8 kW)  single-cylinder engine under the seat and drive to the rear wheels through a two-speed gearbox. This curious design had the passenger facing the driver, who sat in the rear seat. The voiturette had one inestimable advantage: the expanding clutches of the gearbox were operated by a lever on the steering column. The Model D was developed through Models E, G, I, and J, with 6 CV (4.5 kW) by 1902, when the 8 CV (6 kW) Model K rear-entry phaeton appeared, with front-end styling resembling the contemporary Renault. Until World War I, De Dion-Boutons had an unusual decelerator pedal which reduced engine speed and ultimately applied a transmission brake. In 1902, the Model O introduced three speeds, which was standard for all De Dion-Boutons in 1904.

A small number of electric cars were also made in 1901.

Engine supplier to automobile manufacturers
De Dion-Bouton supplied engines to vehicle manufacturers such as Hanzer and Société Parisienne who mounted a 2.5 hp unit directly on the front axle of their front wheel drive voiturette the 'Viktoria Combination'.

Engine supplier to moto bicycle builders
The De Dion-Bouton engine is considered to the first high-speed lightweight internal combustion engine. It was licensed to more than 150 manufacturers and was a popular choice among assemblers of moto bicycles. The small lightweight four cycle engine used a battery and coil ignition that was less trouble than the hot tube ignition. It was used on many pioneering moto bicycle brands and was widely copied by many makers including US Brands Indian and Harley-Davidson.

American De Dion
In 1901, the De Dion-Bouton Motorette Company began manufacturing De Dion-Bouton automobiles under license in Brooklyn, New York. A small quantity of American De Dion Motorettes were made. These had either 2-seater vis-a-vis or closed coachwork and were powered by 3.5 hp American-made engines.

The venture was in operation for only one year. They gained a reputation for unreliability during that time. Representatives of De Dion in the United States claimed that the licensee violated their contract and advertised for a new licensee.

Expansion

In 1900, De Dion-Bouton was the largest automobile manufacturer in the world, producing 400 cars and 3,200 engines. The company soon began producing engines and licenses for other automobile companies with an estimate of 150 makes using them. Production was so great, it proved impossible to test every engine; if it failed on the bench, it was simply disassembled. Every engine was being made by hand; the assembly line had not yet been introduced. By 1904 some 40,000 engines had been supplied across Europe. That year, De Dion-Bouton's factory at Quai National (now Quai de Dion-Bouton), Puteaux, employed 1,300 and produced more than 2,000 cars, all hand-made.

The engine moved to the front in 1903 in the Populaire with  engines, the latter being powerful enough to allow trucks to be added to cars, and by the end of the year reverse gear had also appeared. It was joined by the 6 CV (4 kW) 864 cc (52.5 in3) Types N and Q (the latter a low-priced K), the 8 CV (6 kW) R, and their first multi-cylinder model, the two-cylinder 1728 cc (105 in3) 12 CV (8 kW) S, followed in 1904 by the four-cylinder  15 CV (11 kW) Type AD and 24 CV (18 kW) AI. The cars were also getting more and more conventional in styling, with the radiator moving in front of the engine and the clutch changing from hand lever to pedal.

A pair of works 10 CV (7.5 kW) De Dion-Boutons, in the hands of Cormier and Collignon, ran in the 1907 Peking to Paris rally, without success. Bouvier St. Chaffray did no better in the New York to Paris in 1908. That year, De Dion-Bouton peaked as a manufacturer.

The company became the first to make a successful mass-produced V8 engine, a 35 CV (26 kW)  CJ in 1910, followed by a 7.8 liter and a 14.7 liter for the U.S., as well as by a  Type CN in 1912. (They trailed Ader in racing the 1906 Adams, which used an Antoinette aircraft engine.) This would be the company's last innovation.

During World War I, the company made gun parts, armoured vehicles, and aircraft engines, as well as cars and trucks. The company produced an anti-aircraft version of the French 75 mm field gun, the Canon de 75 modèle 1897, mounted on a V8-powered De Dion-Bouton truck for the French Army between 1913 and 1918.

In Dublin, during the Easter Rising of 1916, which opened the Irish War of Independence, The O'Rahilly drove his De Dion Bouton up to the Irish HQ in O'Connell Street, and, discovering that the Rising he had planned and trained soldiers for and then tried to prevent, was actually going on, he drove it into a barricade, walked into the GPO and said: "I've helped to wind the clock, I've come to hear it strike." He was killed in a charge against a machine gun nest in Moore Street days later. A famous photograph shows the skeleton of the car in its barricade.

Postwar stagnation 
The company stagnated after World War I. The V8 continued to appear until 1923, and in spite of new models with front-wheel brakes, the factory closed for much of 1927. On reopening two models were listed, the Type LA with a  four-cylinder overhead valve, aluminium-piston engine, and the Type LB with a  straight-8. A rumored takeover by Peugeot or Mercedes did not materialize, leading to the end of passenger car production in 1932.

After World War II
Small numbers of commercial vehicles were made until 1950; the last vehicles to carry the De Dion badge were license-made Land Rovers in the early 1950s. The company name was bought by a motorcycle maker in 1955.

Railcars

De Dion-Bouton built railcars and railcar trailers used on many of the metre gauge railways in France and abroad. The first railcars were produced in the early 1920s, with the Chemin de Fer des Côtes-du-Nord receiving its first railcars in 1923.

Notes

References

Sources

 (reprints AB Nordbok 1985 edition).

External links

CNN: World's oldest car for sale

Defunct motor vehicle manufacturers of France
Defunct motor vehicle manufacturers of the United States
Rolling stock manufacturers of France
Steam cars
Electric vehicle manufacturers of France
Brass Era vehicles
Veteran vehicles
1880s cars
1890s cars
1900s cars
1910s cars
1920s cars
1930s cars
Vehicle manufacturing companies established in 1883
Vehicle manufacturing companies disestablished in 1932
Economic history of France
Car manufacturers of France
Motor vehicle manufacturers of France
Truck manufacturers of France